Tear Ya Down: The Rarities is a 2-CD compilation album by the band Motörhead, released in 2002 on the Metal-Is label.

Track listing

Track List

About the Songs

Alternative Recordings
 The Richard-Berry-cover "Louie, Louie" was originally released by Motörhead on the single Louie, Louie in 1978.
 "Tear Ya Down" was originally released on the studio album Overkill in 1979.
 "Like a Nightmare" (or just "Nightmare" on Speed Not Comfort) was originally released on the single No Class in 1979.
 "Stone Dead Forever", "Sharpshooter", "Bomber" and "Step Down" were originally released on the studio album Bomber in 1980.
 "Dirty Love" was originally released on the single Ace of Spades in 1980.
 "Shoot You in the Back", "Love Me Like a Reptile", "Fast and Loose", "Ace of Spades", "(We Are) the Road Crew", "The Hammer", "Fire Fire" and "Jailbait" were originally released on the studio album Ace of Spades in 1980.

All three live versions were recorded at the Town Hall in Birmingham on 3 June 1977 and were originally released on the semi-official live album Blitzkrieg on Birmingham '77 in 1989. The tracks are also included in the 2002 released live compilation Keep Us on the Road – Live 1977, which contains both semi official-live albums Blitzkrieg on Birmingham '77 and Lock up Your Daughters.

References

Motörhead albums
Motörhead compilation albums
Heavy metal compilation albums